The 1997 FIBA Americas Championship for Women, was the fourth FIBA Americas Championship for Women regional basketball championship held by FIBA Americas, which also served as Americas qualifier for the 1998 FIBA World Championship for Women, granting berths to the top four teams in the final standings. It was held in Brazil between 5 August and 10 August 1997. Eight national teams entered the event under the auspices of FIBA Americas, the sport's regional governing body. The city of São Paulo hosted the tournament. Brazil won their first title after defeating the United States in the final.

Format
Teams were split into two round-robin groups of four teams each. The top two teams from each group advanced to the second stage and qualified directly to the 1998 FIBA World Championship for Women. The second stage consisted of another round-robin group of four teams, where the top two teams played an extra game for the championship, and the other two teams played for third place. The results between teams from the same group are carried over to the first round.
The teams that did not advance to the second round were cross-paired (3A vs. 3B, 4A vs. 4B) and played an extra game to define fifth through eighth place in the final standings.

First round

Group A

|}

Group B

|}

Classification stage

Fifth place

Seventh place

Second stage

|}

Third place

Final

Final standings

External links
1997 Championship of the Americas for Women, FIBA.com. Retrieved January 22, 2015.

FIBA Women's AmeriCup
1997 in women's basketball
1997 in Brazilian sport
International women's basketball competitions hosted by Brazil
1997–98 in North American basketball
1997–98 in South American basketball